Red chip stocks are the stocks of mainland China companies incorporated outside mainland China and listed in Hong Kong. It refers to businesses based in mainland China and with (majority) shares controlled either directly or indirectly by a government body. This controlling entity could be one or more combinations of the central, provincial or municipal mainland government, with the company listed in Hong Kong to allow private and overseas investment.

The term was coined by Hong Kong economist Alex Tang in 1992 and combines blue chip stocks with "red" representing the Socialist economic philosophy of the People's Republic of China.

Stock index of red chips 

The Hang Seng China-Affiliated Corporations Index (HSCCI) is a stock market index of 25 red chip companies.

List of red chip companies 

, there were 267 red chip companies, including:

 APT Satellite Holdings
 China Aerospace International Holdings
 China Development Bank International Investment
 China Energine
 China Mobile Ltd
 China Overseas Land and Investment
 China Petroleum & Chemical Corporation
 China Resources Enterprise
 China Telecom Corp., Ltd.
 China Unicom (Hong Kong) Limited
 China Zheshang Bank
 Chongqing Iron and Steel Company
 Cosco Shipping
 Goldwind
 Guangzhou Automobile Group Co Ltd
 Lenovo
 Peking University Resources (Holdings)
 PetroChina
 SMIC
 Tong Ren Tang
 Tsingtao Brewery
 Zijin Mining Group
 ZTE Corporation

See also 

 Chip
 A share
 B share
 H share
 Green Chip
 P chip
 S chip
 N share
 L share
 G share
 China Concepts Stock

References 

Stock market terminology
Finance in Hong Kong
Finance in China